Princes Bridge, originally Prince's Bridge, is a bridge in central Melbourne, Australia that spans the Yarra River. It is built on the site of one of the oldest river crossings in the city, and forms a gateway into the central city from the south. The bridge connects Swanston Street on the north bank of the Yarra River to St Kilda Road on the south bank, and carries road, tram and pedestrian traffic. The present bridge was built in 1888 and is listed on the Victorian Heritage Register.

Because of its position, Princes Bridge is often a focal point for celebratory events in Melbourne such as the Moomba Festival, New Year's Eve and many celebrations taking place on the Yarra River where it flows through the city.

History

First bridge
When the first European settlers settled in Melbourne in 1835, there was no permanent crossing point of the Yarra River. Over time various punt and ferry operators set up business to ferry people and other traffic across the river. The colonial government in Sydney was unreliable in providing funds for the construction of a bridge, resulting in most of Melbourne’s early infrastructure being provided by private enterprise. On 22 April 1840, a private company was formed to construct a bridge across the Yarra. Traders in Elizabeth Street vied with those in Swanston Street to have the through traffic that would be generated by a bridge. On the south bank of the river, St Kilda Road was still a dirt track.

The Superintendent of the Port Phillip District, Charles La Trobe, favoured an Elizabeth Street crossing, but despite such official pressure the private company favoured the construction conditions at Swanston Street, which had become regarded as the growing town's main street. In 1844, a wooden trestle bridge was built across the river, and was a toll bridge colloquially known as Balbirnies Bridge. The bridge was built for £400 from June-Oct 1843 just to the East of where Princes Bridge stands today. Described as "a primitive construction of piles & planking, 120ft. in length & with a road-way 17ft. wide, flanked on one side by a railed-off footpath", it was in use for 5 years, 1843-48. Tolls were leased to Mr. R. A. Balbirnie, whence the name derived. In disuse from 1848, it was demolished Oct 1852, although famed chronicler of early Melbourne, the journalist "Garyowen" reported some remnant piles from the bridge could still be seen the Yarra's waters as late as 1883.

Second bridge
The foundation stone for a new bridge was laid in 1846, and the bridge was opened in on 15 November 1850. The opening was incorporated amongst extensive celebrations for the Royal Assent to the Australian Colonies Act. This Act enabled separation from NSW of the Port Phillip District, establishing Victoria as a separate colony effective on 1 July 1851. The bridge was a single-span 150 ft (46 m) bluestone and granite arch bridge, with a rise of only 24 ft (7 m). At its building, it was one of the longest, flattest stone arch bridges in the world. Paid for with government funds, the bridge was designed by David Lennox and built by James Linacre. It was opened on 15 November without tolls.

At the foundation-laying ceremony, Superintendent La Trobe named the structure "Prince's Bridge" in honour of Albert, Prince of Wales. It seems also to have been known as "Lennox’s Bridge," after its designer.

Third (current) bridge
Within a year of the bridge's opening, gold was discovered in country Victoria and Melbourne saw a massive increase in population. In addition to the increase in traffic crossing the bridge, there was also a need to handle increased shipping traffic on the Yarra River, and the river was widened to cope with this. By that time the Yarra River had been heavily modified both upstream and downstream, and the major floods of the early years were becoming less common. In the late 1870s it was decided to replace the 1850 bridge, and a competition was held in 1879. This was won by architect and engineer John Grainger, only recently arrived in Adelaide, in partnership with local architect Mr Jenkins, with a design largely as eventually built. Jenkins was likely included simply as a local representative, with the design mainly by John Grainger (1855–1917), who already had experience with bridges, and who was working alone by the time the bridge was completed. (Grainger was the father of the Australian composer Percy Grainger.) Construction was delayed over funding and other issues, and it was not until 1884 that the old bridge was disassembled and replaced by a temporary structure. The stones were lettered and numbered and neatly stacked, to allow future re-erection at another location. In the event this did not occur, as the materials were instead reused in the replacement bridge.

David Munro & Co. supplied the winning bid for the construction of £136,998 9s.9d., incorporating reused materials from the old bridge and ironwork fabricated by Langlands foundry in Melbourne. (Munro was also responsible for the construction of Queens Bridge and the nearby Sandridge Bridge.)

The foundation stone of the new bridge was laid on 7 September 1886, and a memorial stone with a suitable inscription was built in over its position in the west end of the south abutment. The new bridge was opened on 4 October 1888, in time for the second International Exhibition to be held in Melbourne. As with many historic Melburnian buildings and bridges, the bridge is built on solid bluestone and concrete bulwarks with plenty of cast iron. The abutments, piers and wing walls are built of solid bluestone.

In 1924, the bridge was reinforced to take the weight of the electric trams which were soon to replace the previous cable trams along St Kilda Road and the side-streets. The name of the bridge is now rendered as Princes Bridge, in line with the policy that possessive apostrophes are not used in place names.

Princes Bridge was also the name of a railway station located on the northern side of the river, to the east of the bridge, on the current site of Federation Square. It was linked to Flinders Street station by the railway tracks that run underneath the northern approach to the bridge.

Until about June 2013 there were two vehicle lanes and a tram lane across the bridge in each direction; the wide footpaths on each side were divided for pedestrians and bicycles. At that time the bicycle lanes were moved to the road surface and the number of vehicle lanes was reduced to a single lane in each direction - starting with the Western (in-bound) side.

Traffic
Pedestrians account for the majority of traffic over the bridge, but other forms of traffic include motor vehicles, trams, buses and bicycles, as well as an occasional tourist-orientated horse-drawn carriage. The destination of pedestrian traffic is two way, with many commuters parking at the Arts Centre and going to work in the CBD, as well as visitors to the Melbourne Arts Precinct on the Southbank side.

Design
Princes Bridge is 30 metres (99 ft) wide and 120 metres (400 ft) long, with Harcourt granite squat half columns resting on the bluestone piers that support the three iron girder arch spans. The coat of arms on the bridge belong to the municipal councils who contributed towards the cost of construction. Other design features include an elaborate balustrade along the top of the bridge, and lamp standards crowning each pier.

The bridge design bears a close resemblance to the earlier Blackfriars Bridge over the River Thames in London, a resemblance which was noted at its opening. Princes Bridge is wider, 30 metres compared with 26 metres, but with 3 spans of 33 metres and an overall length of 131 metres, it is much shorter than Blackfriars Bridge's 5 spans with a central span of 61 metres. Both are excellent surviving examples of Arch Bridge design in the late 19th century.

The bridge underwent a restoration before the 2006 Commonwealth Games.

Gallery

See also
Crossings of the Yarra River

References

External links

 Federation Square web site History of the Federation Square site, including a PDF file documenting some of the history of Princes Bridge.
 Panoramic virtual tour from Princes Bridge

Bridges in Melbourne
Heritage sites in Melbourne
Bridges completed in 1888
Road bridges in Victoria (Australia)
Bridges over the Yarra River
1888 establishments in Australia
Former toll bridges in Australia
Landmarks in Melbourne
Buildings and structures in the City of Melbourne (LGA)
Transport in the City of Melbourne (LGA)
Southbank, Victoria